Cross Kirkland Corridor is a  rail trail and linear park in the city of Kirkland, Washington. It is Kirkland's segment of the multi-city Eastside Rail Corridor on the Eastside Seattle suburbs.

After acquisition, the corridor was approved by the city for future light rail and other transit use.

Feriton Spur Park

The city developed Feriton Spur Park approximately halfway between ends of the trail, in public–private partnership with Google, where one of the company's Kirkland campuses surrounds the park.

Public art
Under a city construction budget set-aside for public art in Kirkland, art is installed on the corridor. The first such work was The Spikes, created in 2017 by Lake Washington Institute of Technology welding student Merrily Dicks, and consisting of three  columns of recycled railroad spikes, rising from a  metal base.

References

External links

Parks in Kirkland, Washington
Geography of Kirkland, Washington
Rail trails in Washington (state)
Transportation in King County, Washington